Hyde Park, Vermont, may refer to:

 Hyde Park (town), Vermont,  a town in and the shire town (county seat) of Lamoille County, Vermont, United States.
 Hyde Park (village), Vermont, a village in the town of Hyde Park, Vermont, United States
 North Hyde Park, Vermont, a village in the town of Hyde Park, Vermont, United States